Green Mountain Lake is a lake in Wright County, in the U.S. state of Minnesota.

Green Mountain Lake was named after the Green Mountains of Vermont, the native state of a share of the early settlers.

See also
List of lakes in Minnesota

References

Lakes of Minnesota
Lakes of Wright County, Minnesota